Pigeon is a village in Huron County in the U.S. state of Michigan.  The population was 1,208 at the 2010 census. The village is within Winsor Township.

Geography

Demographics

2010 census
As of the census of 2010, there were 1,208 people, 551 households, and 323 families living in the village. The racial makeup of the village was 98.6% White, 0.3% African American, 0.2% Native American, 0.2% Asian, 0.2% from other races, and 0.5% from two or more races. Hispanic or Latino of any race were 2.8% of the population.

There were 551 households, of which 23.4% had children under the age of 18 living with them, 47.5% were married couples living together, 7.1% had a female householder with no husband present, 4.0% had a male householder with no wife present, and 41.4% were non-families. 39.2% of all households were made up of individuals, and 25.9% had someone living alone who was 65 years of age or older. The average household size was 2.13 and the average family size was 2.84.

The median age in the village was 47.2 years. 19.5% of residents were under the age of 18; 6.8% were between the ages of 18 and 24; 20.4% were from 25 to 44; 24.9% were from 45 to 64; and 28.2% were 65 years of age or older. The gender makeup of the village was 45.9% male and 54.1% female.

2000 census
As of the census of 2000, there were 1,207 people, 496 households, and 332 families living in the village. The racial makeup of the village was 96.60% White, 0.17% African American, 0.33% Native American, 0.58% Asian, 1.08% from other races, and 1.24% from two or more races. Hispanic or Latino of any race were 2.57% of the population.

There were 496 households, out of which 27.6% had children under the age of 18 living with them, 57.3% were married couples living together, 6.0% had a female householder with no husband present, and 32.9% were non-families. 28.8% of all households were made up of individuals, and 16.9% had someone living alone who was 65 years of age or older.  The average household size was 2.33 and the average family size was 2.84.

In the village, the population was spread out, with 22.0% under the age of 18, 6.0% from 18 to 24, 25.8% from 25 to 44, 20.2% from 45 to 64, and 26.1% who were 65 years of age or older.  The median age was 42 years. For every 100 females, there were 89.5 males.  For every 100 females age 18 and over, there were 85.1 males.

The median income for a household in the village was $33,618, and the median income for a family was $44,563. Males had a median income of $31,599 versus $19,886 for females. The per capita income for the village was $17,142.  About 5.0% of families and 6.4% of the population were below the poverty line, including 9.0% of those under age 18 and 5.6% of those age 65 or over.

Local attractions and activities
Pigeon Historical Depot Museum is in the downtown.  The Grand Trunk Chesapeake and Ohio Railroad Depot is a state historical site. Local artifacts and memorabilia are displayed.  A number of wind farms have been built in and around Pigeon in 2007 and beyond.

See also

 List of villages in Michigan

Notes

External links

 Huron County website and links

Villages in Huron County, Michigan
Villages in Michigan